Red 2 may refer to:

 Amaranth (dye) (also FD&C Red No. 2), a modified red azo dye used as a food dye and to color cosmetics
 Citrus Red 2, an artificial dye
 Red 2 (film), an American action comedy film and sequel to the 2010 film Red
 "Red 2", a 1994 single by English electronic music DJ, producer and radio presenter Dave Clarke
 "Red-2", a season-four episode of the police procedural drama television series NCIS: Los Angeles
 Wedge Antilles (also called Red Two), a fictional character in the Star Wars franchise